Threat Agent Cloud Tactical Intercept & Countermeasure, or TACTIC, is a United States military research program whose goal is to detect, classify, and neutralize airborne biological and chemical warfare agents.

Overview
As Dr. Karen Wood, program manager of TACTIC in the Tactical Technology Office of DARPA, explains:
The purpose of the Threat Agent Cloud Tactical Intercept and Countermeasure (TACTIC) Program is to provide the United States (US) military with the capability to protect the warfighter from CWA/BWA threat clouds on the battlefield. The goal of the program is to provide a system that can rapidly detect and identify the presence of a typical threat cloud and provide a countermeasure to that cloud that will kill it before it reaches the intended target.

Detection and discrimination
The program's goal is to be able to detect and identify CWA/BWA threats within the time frame of one minute. Research includes such methodologies as:
 bead-based assays for biological molecules
 fluorescent assays for chemical molecules
 retro-reflector assays for both chemical and biological molecules

Removal of threat
Upon successfully determining the nature of the CWA/BWA threat, "technologies that mimic the seeding of rain clouds will be developed for particulate bio-agents, and technologies that react with chemical agent vapor will be investigated." When an effective system for both identifying and countering the CWA/BWA threat is engineered, DARPA will then provide a prototype which will be vigorously tested in aerosol chambers. Only after completion of chamber testing will full-scale field testing commence.

See also
Biodefense
Biological warfare
Chemical warfare

References

External links
 TACTIC Program summary at DARPA's Strategic Technology Office

Military of the United States